Strokestown Park House is a Palladian style Georgian house in Strokestown, County Roscommon, Ireland, set on about .

The house and National Famine Museum in the grounds are both open to the public.

History 
The house was the family home of the Cromwellian planter family, the Mahons, from the 1600s until 1979. Captain Nicholas Mahon was the first to be granted over 2,700 acres in the Barony of Roscommon in February 1666 while he was later granted over 3,000 acres in the baronies of Roscommon and Ballintober in July 1678. The later grant was originally in the possession of the O'Conor Roe and became the Strokestown estate.

In 1696, a house appears to have been completed by John Mahon which had earlier been started by his farther Captain Nicholas Mahon. This was likely built on top of a ruinous sixteenth century castle structure which was said to have been destroyed in 1552 by Mac Diarmada.

Later, his great-grandson, Maurice Mahon, purchased several additional lands, following elevation to the Peerage of Ireland as the first Baron Hartland in 1800.

The Great Famine
Many evictions of poor tenant farmers occurred during the Great Famine. The Mahon family alone in 1847 evicted 3,000 people. After the killing of Major Denis Mahon in November 1847, as a direct reaction to the large scale deaths of those sent on famine ships to Canada by the Strokestown estate  at the height of the Famine, his only daughter, Grace Catherine, vowed never to return to her ancestral seat. She was on honeymoon at the time, having been married only weeks earlier, to Henry Sandford Pakenham, son of Dean Henry Pakenham of Tullynally, and heir to the vast Pakenham and Sandford estates in counties Longford, Westmeath and Roscommon. Grace Catherine never returned to Strokestown, but her marriage undoubtedly saved the estate from bankruptcy. On the eve of the Famine, the estate was in debt with over £30,000 having accrued as a result of family dispute over inheritance and expensive land purchases which had gathered from the second half of the eighteenth century. The marriage alliance (by which Henry Sandford Pakenham assumed the additional surname of Mahon), united the estates of both families to comprise over 26,000 acres, and the Strokestown estate remained one of the largest in Roscommon until his death in 1893. The Pakenham fortune also enabled large scale investment in various estate improvement projects on the Strokestown estate, including drainage, turf cutting and agricultural schemes, development of the urban market in the town of Strokestown. However, despite the family fortunes improving Strokestown continued a policy of assisted emigration to Canada and land clearances of tenant families.

20th century
In 1911 and 1912, over 8,600 acres were vested in the Congested Districts Board for Ireland in order to alleviate poverty by redistributing and making more efficient use of agricultural land.

Since 1979, Strokestown Park has been owned by a Roscommon-based company, the Westward Group. The last of the Mahon family, Olive Pakenham Mahon, left the house in 1981 and moved to England where she died a year later.

Restoration
In 1997, the  walled pleasure garden was officially opened by the President of Ireland, Mary Robinson, having been faithfully restored with the assistance of an ERDF grant through the Great Gardens of Ireland Restoration Programme and a FÁS scheme.

In 2013, Strokestown Park House was the setting for TV3's documentary, The Big House.

In 2022 the National Famine Museum and Palladian House were reopened after extensive restoration. The whole estate is now cared for and managed by The Irish Heritage Trust a not for profit charity.

National Famine Museum 
Today, the Strokestown estate is synonymous with the Great Famine and includes the National Irish Famine Museum. The museum contains some of the best records from the time of the Famine. The museum was built by the Westward Group and all the documents on display in the museum are from the estate. The exhibit aims to explain the Great Irish Famine and to draw parallels with the occurrence of famine in the world today.

References

External links
 Strokestown Park - official site

Buildings and structures in County Roscommon
Country houses in Ireland
Museums in County Roscommon
Historic house museums in the Republic of Ireland
Palladian architecture in Ireland